Wet Hollow is a valley in Oregon County in the U.S. state of Missouri.

Wet Hollow was named for the fact the area is often wet.

References

Valleys of Oregon County, Missouri
Valleys of Missouri